Feeling Good is a studio album by American musician Roy Ayers. It was released in 1982 through Polydor Records, making it his last album for the label. Recording sessions for the album took place at Electric Lady Studios and Sigma Sound Studios in New York City.

Track listing

Charts

References

External links 

1982 albums
Roy Ayers albums
Polydor Records albums
Albums recorded at Electric Lady Studios
Albums recorded at Sigma Sound Studios
Albums produced by Roy Ayers